Irwin Toy Limited was a Canadian distributor and manufacturer of toys. It was Canada's oldest toy company and remained independent and family owned until 2001.

History 
The company began in 1926 as an importer and distributor of dry goods and clothing, located in Sam and Beatrice Irwin's house. Later on, the company moved to a warehouse in the west end of Toronto and focused mainly on toys. Sam and Beatrice's sons, Arnold and Mac Irwin, took over management of the company in the years to follow.

Most of Irwin's profits came from distributing other (usually American) companies' toys. Almost all of the more popular toys available in Canada until the early 1990s were distributed by Irwin. Major American companies wished to sell their toys in Canada, but did not open Canadian branches because of the lower population and tariffs which would generate less income for them. Irwin's success came mainly due to their licensing and contract manufacturing of American companies Kenner and Parker, where Irwin was the Canadian importer and distributor of their products.

The business found success with the help of the Hula Hoop, Slinky, Frisbee, and later on in the century with the popular Star Wars action figures, Care Bears and the Easy-Bake Oven. In the early 1980s, the Atari Video Computer System was a success, and Irwin was the Canadian distributor. Irwin would also acquire the rights to the Sega video game brand in Canada later on. The video game sales helped fuel revenues of $100 million and growth for the company. The company also had a junior shareholders program to have children become interested in the toy company and introduce them to the stock market.

The company had 350 employees at their downtown Toronto factory.

1972-1987 Ed Hurst, Jerry Inch and Bob Blakely, in charge of Irwins Frisbee promotions,  were instrumental in the introduction of disc sports (Frisbee) across Canada. With the use of performing Frisbee athletes Ken Westerfield and Jim Kenner,  Irwin partnered with several major companies such as Lee Jeans, Orange Crush, and Air Canada.  Together they sponsored Frisbee show tours and the beginning of organized disc sports programs in Canada. Two successful nationally sponsored tournaments were the Canadian Jr Frisbee Championships and the Canadian Open Frisbee Championships (1972-1985).

During the 1980s and 1990s, major American companies such as Hasbro, Mattel, and Kenner, acquired many of the companies which Irwin did business with.

In the 1980s, with the introduction of the Free Trade Agreement and later, the North American Free Trade Agreement, it became less expensive for American companies to form their own Canadian branches where Irwin lost many business deals as major toy companies began to distribute toys themselves.

In 1989, Irwin Toy challenged the constitutionality of a Quebec law prohibiting advertising directed toward children. The Irwin Toy Ltd. v. Quebec (Attorney General) case reached the Supreme Court resulting in a landmark ruling regarding the interpretation of freedom of expression provision in the Canadian Charter of Rights and Freedoms.

As Irwin Toy faced financial and business difficulties, the company was sold to a private investment group, LivGroup Ltd. of Toronto in 2001 for approximately $55 million. Eighteen months after the buyout, Irwin Toy, now owned by Richard Ivey and Jean Marie Halde of Toronto, declared bankruptcy and entered into creditor supported liquidation. The original factory was sold to developers for $10 million and converted into a condominium called Toy Factory Lofts.

Following liquidation, the company officially closed down, then in 2003 was re-purchased by the former employees, George and Peter Irwin.

Brands and Toys distributed 

 1 vs. 100
 A-Team
 American Gladiators
 Atari
 Bandai
 Barcode Battler
 Dowell-Brown Power Fighters
 Dino-Riders
 Dragon Ball Z
 Easy-Bake Oven
 Etch-a-Sketch
 Flintstones
 Frisbee
 Ideal
 Ipix
 Jenga
 Kenner (prior to Hasbro's purchase)
 Kids Can Press
 Lil' Sport
 Magic Dip
 Meccano
 My One and Only
 Mighty Max
 Mighty Morphin Power Rangers
 Oopsie Daisy
 Pound Puppies
 Power Wheels
 Pressman
 ReBoot
 Robotech
 Sailor Moon
 Sega
 Simpsons
 Snoopy
 Slinky
 Spawn
 Square 1
 Tyco (prior to Mattel's purchase)
 Wham-O
 Wheel of Fortune
 Who Wants to Be a Millionaire?
 Wrebbit
 Zaks

Toys and games manufactured 

 3D Snakes & Ladders
 Dragon Ball Z Action Figures & Items
 Fib Finder
 Frisbee manufactured in Canada under a Wham-O license.
 Girder & Panel Building Sets
 Globetrotters
 I See It!
 iPix
 i-Top
 Interior Decorator Set (with Marvin Glass and Associates) 1964
 Irwin Toy Pedal Motorcycle 1960s
 Lazer Doodle
 Lil Makin Faces
 IToys LCD Handheld & Deluxe Games.
 ME2
 My One and Only Guy dolls, like "Cliff the Aviator"
 Oozers
 Paint-Sation
 Powerplay Hockey
 ReBoot Action Figures
 Sailor Moon Adventure Dolls & other Sailor Moon items
 Skwooshi
 SpectraColor
 Street Stackers
 Suzie Stretch dolls
 The G.U.R.L.Z.
 Thunderbirds
 Top Corner Hockey
 Trouble (usually under the name "Frustration")
 Deal or No Deal (U.S. version only)

References

Sources
 
 https://web.archive.org/web/20090609232917/http://www.koskieminsky.com/client_links/IrwinToy/home.aspx
 Toronto Star Article 
 ProfitGuide.com

Game manufacturers
Toy companies of Canada
Toy companies established in 1926
Retail companies established in 1926
1926 establishments in Ontario